The Skrinkle Sandstones Group is a late Devonian to early Carboniferous lithostratigraphic group (a sequence of rock strata) in west Wales. The name is derived from the bay of Skrinkle Haven in south Pembrokeshire. The Group comprises the Gupton and overlying West Angle formations and is up to 300m thick. It was deposited south of the east–west aligned Ritec Fault.

References

Carboniferous System of Europe
Devonian System of Europe
Geology of Wales
Geological groups of the United Kingdom